

Systems

Tropical storm 01P

Tropical Depression Charlotte

Severe Tropical Cyclone David

Tropical Cyclone Elsa

Severe Tropical Cyclone Frances

Tropical Depression George

Tropical Cyclone Hope

Tropical Cyclone Jan

Severe Tropical Cyclone Watorea

Season effects

See also

Atlantic hurricane seasons: 1975, 1976
Eastern Pacific hurricane seasons: 1975, 1976
Western Pacific typhoon seasons: 1975, 1976
North Indian Ocean cyclone seasons: 1975, 1976

References

External links

 
South Pacific cyclone seasons
Articles which contain graphical timelines